James Andrew Brakefield (October 23, 1918 – October 14, 2002) was an American football and baseball coach.  He served as the head football coach at Wofford College in Spartanburg, South Carolina from 1967 to 1970 and at Appalachian State University in Boone, North Carolina from 1971 to 1979, compiling a career college football record of 75–64–4. Brakefield was also the head baseball coach at Wofford from 1954 to 1967.  He was an assistant football coach for 17 seasons under Conley Snidow at Emory and Henry College in Emory, Virginia and at Wofford.

Head coaching record

Football

References

1918 births
2002 deaths
Appalachian State Mountaineers football coaches
Centre Colonels football players
Emory and Henry Wasps football coaches
Wofford Terriers baseball coaches
Wofford Terriers football coaches
People from Walker County, Alabama